The 1982–83 Serie A season was won by Roma.

Teams
Hellas Verona, Sampdoria and Pisa had been promoted from Serie B.

Final classification

Results

Top goalscorers

References and sources
Almanacco Illustrato del Calcio - La Storia 1898-2004, Panini Edizioni, Modena, September 2005

External links

 :it:Classifica calcio Serie A italiana 1983 - Italian version with pictures and info.
  - All results on RSSSF Website.
A collection of goals

Serie A seasons
Italy
1982–83 in Italian football leagues